"Should've Asked Her Faster" is a debut song written by Bob DiPiero, Al Anderson and Joe Klimek, and recorded by American country music artist Ty England. It was released in May 1995 as the lead-off single from the eponymous Ty England album.

Chart performance
"Should've Asked Her Faster" debuted at number 69 on the U.S. Billboard Hot Country Singles & Tracks for the week of June 10, 1995.

Year-end charts

Other versions
England re-recorded the song on his 1999 album Highways & Dance Halls as Tyler England, featuring Steve Wariner on lead guitar.

References

1995 debut singles
1995 songs
Ty England songs
Songs written by Bob DiPiero
Songs written by Al Anderson (NRBQ)
Song recordings produced by Garth Fundis
RCA Records singles